Giovanny Stiven Pulgarín López (born 5 January 1993) is a Colombian male badminton player.

Achievements

BWF International Challenge/Series
Men's Singles

 BWF International Challenge tournament
 BWF International Series tournament
 BWF Future Series tournament

References

External links
 

Living people
1993 births
Colombian male badminton players
Competitors at the 2010 South American Games